Zenbu Media is a media company located in New York City, United States and founded by Steve Bernstein that is focused on the music industry, sporting the slogan "we live for music."

Print 
Zenbu Media formerly published Relix magazine, Global Rhythm magazine, Metal Edge Magazine, and Metal Maniacs magazine.
 Relix Magazine Relix Magazine was founded in 1974 by Les Kippel as a newsletter focusing on The Grateful Dead.  Originally the publication was called Dead Relix and was less than twenty pages thick with a hand-drawn black and white cover.  By 1978 Dead Relix had dropped the word "Dead" from its title and expanded to include articles about the entire Bay Area psychedelic scene.  From here the scope of Relix expanded to encompass a vast array of musical genres such as reggae and heavy metal.  This caused the magazine to lose direction until it rallied behind its original focus on The Grateful Dead.  However, Relix did not revert entirely to its old ways and managed to also cover various genres of music and even some non-music related issues.  Soon after this transformation Relix became known as a magazine that broke acts, with many emerging bands making their debut in Relix columns such as "Independents Daze" and "On the Edge."

After the passing of Jerry Garcia in 1995 Relix was forced to move away from its coverage of The Grateful Dead.  Embracing change, it began to report on jambands and other genres of music not considered as mainstream.  In 2000 the magazine was purchased by Steve Bernstein and in 2007 it entered the Rock and Roll Hall of Fame. Today, Relix covers a variety of jambands, indie rockers, singer-songwriters, and the live music scene in general.  Also, each issue comes with a free CD sampling various up and coming bands. Bernstein sold "Relix" to Relix Media Group in 2009.

 Global Rhythm Magazine Global Rhythm was founded in 2000 by Publisher, Alecia Cohen. In November 2005 Global Rhythm was acquired by Steve Bernstein who subsequently became publisher. Alecia Cohen remained on staff as associate publisher. Global Rhythm is a music and lifestyle magazine featuring coverage of world music, film, cuisine and travel. Published monthly and circulated across North America, Europe and hundreds of other locations worldwide, New York-based Global Rhythm is a vital source of music and arts news and reviews for a worldly and sophisticated consumer niche. Each issue of Global Rhythm includes a 15-track compilation CD.

 Metal Edge Metal Edge was the longest-running metal magazine in America. It was first published by Sterling Publishing in 1985 and was closed in 2009. Its founding editor was Gerri Miller.

 Metal Maniacs Metal Maniacs covered heavy metal music and was founded in 1989 by Mike Greenhaus and Kathrine Ludwig.  The magazine was focused on covering the underground metal with an emphasis on the black and death metal genres.  It was published by Sterling until Zenbu Media purchased it.  Metal Maniacs'' was published ten times annually. It was closed in 2009.

Events 
Zenbu Media is in charge of two major events: The Jammys and the Green Apple Music & Arts Festival.

The Jammy Awards 
The Jammys is an award show geared towards jam bands but also including other live improvisational genres of music.

Green Apple Music Festival 
The Green Apple Music & Arts Festival (GAMAF) is America's largest Earth Day celebration. Founded by music producer and former Wetlands Preserve club owner Peter Shapiro and Relix Magazine, the annual event features an eclectic array of musical performances in venues and rock clubs, as well as large-scale free public outdoor concerts. The Festival's mission is to raise environmental awareness by combining live musical performances from diverse genres with educational outreach and cultural events suitable for all audiences. The festival is held around Earth Day, April 22, the world's largest secular holiday observed by over a billion people each year.

In 2006, the event's first year, the Green Apple Music & Arts Festival took place in New York City. A year later, the celebration had spread across the United States to over 60 live music venues featuring over 200 performances in New York, Chicago and San Francisco.

In 2008, continuing its partnership with Earth Day Network, Green Apple Music & Arts Festival will expand to additional U.S. cities including Miami, Washington D.C., Dallas and Denver.

"By featuring a diverse group of musicians and uniting these venues under one cause, we are able to coordinate an exciting, and unprecedented event. We hope the national footprint of the Festival will help inform as many people as possible on these important issues. And, we hope to keep expanding in future years. I think everyone would agree that Earth Day should be recognized in a big way every year." -Peter Shapiro, Executive Producer

Relix Records 
Relix Records is a boutique record label established to help artists create, market and distribute their music in the US and internationally. Current releases include: Jonah Smith, John Popper Project featuring DJ Logic and Phil Lesh & Friends.

Additionally, Relix Classics, and imprint of Relix Records digitally release the works of heritage artists such as Jorma Kaukonen, Hot Tuna, Flying Burrito Brothers and the New Riders of the Purple Sage.  These are distributed digitally by Egami Media.

As the owner of these recordings, Zenbu filed lawsuits in January 2015 against streaming-music companies such as Apple's Beats, Sony, Google, Rdio, Songza, and Slacker for streaming pre-1972 recordings without having licensed them. All of the lawsuits were quickly dismissed, except for the lawsuit against Sony.

Wear Your Music 
"Wear Your Music" is a charitable project sponsored by Zenbu, in which artists donate guitar strings which are made into collectable bracelets and sold, with the profits going to a charity of the artist's choice.

Digital 
Zenbu Media is in charge of many websites.  Each magazine the company publishes has its own web page complete with a free online subscription.  The record label, the Jammy Awards, the Green Apple Music & Arts Festival, and Wear Your Music also have their own websites.

In addition to these websites, Zenbu Media runs jambands.com and zendition.com.

Jambands.com 
Jambands.com is a website that is designed to meet all possible jam band needs.  It has jam band news, products, forums, classifieds, and probably much more. Bernstein sold Jambands.com to Relix Media Group in 2009.

Zendition.com 
Zenbu Media and Techistry, the founders of Zendition, possess over 6o years of combined print media and software development experience. Zendition is a way to transform a magazine or any other similar kind of printed product into an electronic edition that maintains the true-to-print look and feel.

References

External links 
Official Zenbu Site
Relix Magazine
Global Rhythm Magazine
Metal Edge Magazine
Metal Maniacs Magazine
Relix Records
Green Apple Festival
Wear Your Music

Mass media companies of the United States
Companies based in New York City